Blažo Šćepanović (7 April 1934 – 26 August 1966) was a Montenegrin and Yugoslav writer.

Biography
Šćepanović was born in 1934 in the Bijelo Polje settlement Livadice. He graduated from the University of Belgrade Faculty of Philosophy. He worked in the Cultural and Educational Council of the SFR Yugoslavia.

Together with the poet Lazar Vučković, he drowned in Lake Ohrid, during his stay at the Struga Poetry Evenings, one of the most important cultural events in the former Yugoslavia. Another poet, Oskar Davičo, was with them and also fell in the water when the boat capsized but survived because he knew how to swim while Vučković and Šćepanović did not.

Although Šćepanović died at the very beginning of his poetry career, he managed to leave behind several collections of poetry.

Works
Books
 Lobanja u travi (1957)
 Ivicom zemlje zmija (1958)
 Smrću protiv smrti (1959) – together with Branko Miljković
 Smrt pjesnikova (1961)
 Zlatna šuma (1966)
 Ljubavlju izmjereno vrijeme (1973) – published posthumously
 Pjesnikov dvojnik (1976) – published posthumously

References

External links

1934 births
1966 deaths
People from Bijelo Polje
Serbs of Montenegro
Serbian male poets
Serbian male writers
Montenegrin poets
Montenegrin male writers
University of Belgrade Faculty of Philosophy alumni
Deaths by drowning
Accidental deaths in Yugoslavia